Viscount   was the 14th (and final) daimyō of Ōtawara Domain in Shimotsuke Province, Japan (modern-day Tochigi Prefecture) under the Bakumatsu period Tokugawa shogunate. His courtesy title was Hida-no-kami, and his Court rank was Junior Fifth Rank, Lower Grade, later raised to Upper Fifth Rank.

Biography
Ōtawara Kazukiyo was the eldest son of Ōtawara Tomikiyo, the 13th daimyō of Ōtawara. He became daimyō in 1862 on his father's death. In 1868, with the start of the Boshin War, he immediate pledged fealty to the new Meiji government and was awarded with reconfirmation in his holdings. In 1869 he was appointed imperial governor of Ōtawara, although the government also demanded 5000 ryō in gold to help pay for the costs of the Boshin War. With the abolition of the han system in July 1871, he retired and relocated to Tokyo, where he attended the Keio Gijuku university.

With the establishment of the kazoku peerage system he was awarded with the title of shishaku (viscount) in 1884. In 1899, he was appointed to a seat in the House of Peers, where he served until 1923. He died in 1930.

See also
Ōtawara Domain

References 
 Koyasu Nobushige (1880). Buke kazoku meiyoden 武家家族名誉伝 Volume 1. Tokyo: Koyasu Nobushige. (Accessed from National Diet Library, 17 July 2008)

Tozama daimyo
1861 births
1930 deaths
People of the Boshin War
People of Meiji-period Japan
Kazoku
Members of the House of Peers (Japan)